Ida Siegal (born November 5, 1977) is an American television journalist who has been an on-air news reporter for NBC New York since January 2003.  She has covered a number of prominent stories during her career, such as the Howard Beach bias attack, the December 2005 transit strike, and the Blizzard of 2003.

Education
Siegal graduated magna cum laude from the S. I. Newhouse School of Public Communications at Syracuse University with a double major in broadcast journalism and public policy.

Career
Beginning in 1999 and continuing until she joined WNBC, Siegal worked as a reporter and anchor at News 12 in the Bronx.  Among the stories she covered during this period were the September 11 attacks, the trial of police officers indicted for the killing of Amadou Diallo.  While at News 12 in the Bronx, she also served as a reporter for News 12 Long Island, where she covered education, crime and politics. She is also an Author of the children's book series Emma is on the air.

References

Living people
New York (state) television reporters
Television anchors from New York City
1977 births
American women television journalists
American women children's writers
S.I. Newhouse School of Public Communications alumni
21st-century American women writers